Vyznanie is the fifth compilation album by Marika Gombitová, and her second featuring two compact discs. The set was released on OPUS in 2007.

Track listing

Official releases
 2007: Vyznanie, 2CD, OPUS #91 2784

Personnel

 Marika Gombitová – lead vocal, writer
 Ján Lehotský – music, lead vocal
 Miroslav Žbirka – music, lead vocal, producer
 Marie Rottrová – lead vocal
 Václav Patejdl – music, lead vocal, producer
 Karel Gott – lead vocal
 Ali Brezovský – music
 Pavol Hammel – music
 Dežo Ursiny – music
 Ján Lauko – music, producer

 Andrej Šeban – music
 Zoro Laurinc – lyrics
 Kamil Peteraj – lyrics
 Ján Štrasser – lyrics
 Milan Vašica – producer
 Peter Breiner – producer
 Peter Smolinský – producer
 Honza Horáček – producer
 Aleš Zenkl – producer

Charts

Album

Singles

Notes
A  "Tak som chcela všetkých milovať" was issued only as a promotional single as the Gombitová's final work by now. In 2008, the composition was in addition remixed by Jarek Šimek.

Certifications

ČNS IFPI
In Slovakia, the International Federation of the Phonographic Industry for the Czech Republic (ČNS IFPI) awards artists since the cancellation of the Slovak national section (SNS IFPI). Currently, there are awarded Gold (for 3,000 units), and/or Platinum certifications (for 6,000 units), exclusively for album releases. Gombitová demonstrably won at least seven platinum, and three golden awards in total.

References

General

Specific

External links 
 

2007 compilation albums
Marika Gombitová compilation albums